This bibliography of Saint Lucia is a list of English-language nonfiction books which have been described by reliable sources as in some way directly relating to the subject of Saint Lucia, its history, geography, people, culture, etc.

Culture

Geography

History

Politics

Notes

Saint Lucia
Bibliographies of countries or regions